The Annual Review of Genetics is an annual peer-reviewed scientific review journal published by Annual Reviews. It was established in 1967 and covers all topics related to the genetics of viruses, bacteria, fungi, plants, and animals, including humans. The current editor is Tatjana Piotrowski. As of 2021, Journal Citation Reports gives the journal a 2020 impact factor of 16.830, ranking it fourth out of 175 journals in the category "Genetics & Heredity".

History
In 1965, the nonprofit publisher Annual Reviews surveyed geneticists to determine if there was a need for an annual journal that published review articles about recent developments in the field of genetics. Responses to the survey were favorable, with the first volume of the Annual Review of Genetics published two years later in 1967. Its inaugural editor was Herschel L. Roman. As of 2020, it was published both in print and electronically.

It defines its scope as covering various aspects of genetics, including molecular, cell, and developmental biology; behavioral genetics, population genetics, chromosome structure and transmission, gene function and expression, mutation and DNA repair, genomics, and immunogenetics. Various organisms are considered, including viruses, bacteria, fungi, plants, and animals. As of 2022, Journal Citation Reports gives the journal a 2021 impact factor of 13.826. It is abstracted and indexed in Scopus, Science Citation Index Expanded, MEDLINE, Embase, and Academic Search, among others.

Editorial processes
The Annual Review of Genetics is helmed by the editor or the co-editors. The editor is assisted by the editorial committee, which includes associate editors, regular members, and occasionally guest editors. Guest members participate at the invitation of the editor, and serve terms of one year. All other members of the editorial committee are appointed by the Annual Reviews board of directors and serve five-year terms. The editorial committee determines which topics should be included in each volume and solicits reviews from qualified authors. Unsolicited manuscripts are not accepted. Peer review of accepted manuscripts is undertaken by the editorial committee.

Editors of volumes
Dates indicate publication years in which someone was credited as a lead editor or co-editor of a journal volume. The planning process for a volume begins well before the volume appears, so appointment to the position of lead editor generally occurred prior to the first year shown here. An editor who has retired or died may be credited as a lead editor of a volume that they helped to plan, even if it is published after their retirement or death. 

 Herschel L. Roman (1967–1984)
 Allan M. Campbell (1985–2011; announced retirement as of 2010, credited as editor for 2011)
 Campbell and Bonnie Bassler (appointed as of 2011; credited as co-editors for 2012)
 Bonnie Bassler (2013-2017)
 Nancy M. Bonini (2018–2021)
 Tatjana Piotrowski (2022-)

Current editorial committee
As of 2022, the editorial committee consists of the editor and the following members:

 Andrew G. Clark
 Dominique C. Bergmann
 Zemer Gitai
 Peter Scheiffele
 John C. Schimenti
 Jeff Sekelsky
 Gisela Storz
 Junying Yuan

References

 

Annual journals
Genetics
Genetics journals
Publications established in 1967
English-language journals